is a 1981 Japanese yakuza film directed by Shinji Sōmai, starring Japanese idol Hiroko Yakushimaru as the main character and based on the novel of the same name by Jirō Akagawa. It was released on 19 December 1981. A satirical take on yakuza films, the storyline involves a teenage delinquent schoolgirl named Izumi Hoshi who inherits her father's yakuza clan. The title is a reference to a scene where the main character shoots several rival gang members with a submachine gun, while wearing a sailor-fuku, the traditional Japanese school uniform.

Sailor Suit and Machine Gun is relatively well known in its home country, and spawned two television series based on and expanding upon its story, one in 1982, and one in 2006. Outside Japan, it is popular in some cult film circles, but has not garnered much mainstream attention. It has been released on Region 2 and Region 3 DVD, the latter being its first release that featured English subtitles. A "spiritual sequel", Sailor Suit and Machine Gun: Graduation, was released on March 5, 2016.

Cast

Reception
The theme song of the film, "Sailor Fuku to Kikanjū", sung by the lead actress, Hiroko Yakushimaru, stayed at the 1st place of the weekly Oricon Singles Chart for five consecutive weeks, from December 21, 1981 (issue date) to January 18, 1982 (issue date).

Box office
The film was released in a double bill with Moeru yūsha on 19 December 1981. Distribution income for the bill reached number one on the domestic market for the period including 1982, reaching ¥2.3 billion in distribution income, and totaling  in gross revenue.

Accolades
It was chosen as the 10th best film at the 4th Yokohama Film Festival.

References

External links

Films directed by Shinji Sōmai
Films based on Japanese novels
Yakuza films
Toei Company films
Japanese LGBT-related films
1980s Japanese films

ja:セーラー服と機関銃#映画